HYI may refer to:
 Harvard–Yenching Institute
 Hydrus, a constellation of the southern sky
 San Marcos Municipal Airport, in Texas, United States